The Kennedy Giant was a British biplane heavy bomber designed by Kennedy Aeroplanes Ltd. during the First World War. The design was an imitation of works by Igor Sikorsky, with whom the owner of Kennedy Aeroplanes Ltd., C. J. H. Mackenzie-Kennedy, had ostensibly worked prior to setting up the company. The aeroplane was a notorious failure; its size meant that construction had to take place in an open field as none of the hangars near Hayes, Middlesex, where the prototype was assembled, were large enough to house it. For its weight, the aircraft's four engines were inadequate, and the resulting under-powered aircraft could only fly in a straight line once airborne. 

Following the unimpressive test flight, the design was cancelled and the prototype was left derelict at Northolt Aerodrome for a number of years.

Specifications

See also
Sikorsky Ilya Muromets
Slesarev Svyatogor

References
Notes

Bibliography

External links
letter on McKenzie-Kennedy in Flight 1967
further letter in Flight 1967
Giant
1910s British bomber aircraft
Four-engined push-pull aircraft
Cancelled military aircraft projects of the United Kingdom
Biplanes
Aircraft first flown in 1917